The Society of St. Pius X in New Zealand is a branch of the Society of Saint Pius X (SSPX) which is an international organisation of traditionalist Catholic priests founded in 1970 by the French archbishop, Marcel Lefebvre.

The Society is based in Whanganui where it has four resident priests and three schools. The Superior of the Society of St Pius X in New Zealand is currently Father François Laisney.

Schools
In Whanganui the society operates a primary school named St Anthony's, a boys secondary school named St Augustine's, and a girls secondary school named St Dominic's College.

Also in Wanganui is a group of Dominican Sisters who are closely aligned with the Society and who provide staff for the girl's secondary school along with a boarding school for international students.

Parishes and services
At St Anthony's Parish, Whanganui, the society provides a full round of Roman Catholic devotional practices in a manner typical of Catholic life before the Second Vatican Council (1962-1965) to a community of 400 people.

In 2015 Bishop Alfonso Ruiz de Galarreta from Spain consecrated the Chapel of the Immaculate Heart of Mary and St John Fisher, Auckland (Avondale). The society acquired the building from Ngongotahā where it had been a Catholic church until deconsecrated. Until opening the chapel, the society had worshipped in many different places in Auckland including hockey clubs, and movie theatres "and anywhere we could."

Priests of the society regularly celebrate Tridentine Mass in several other centres in New Zealand including at the Chapel of St Michael the Archangel, Wellington (Tawa) and Mass centres in Whangārei, Hamilton and Napier.

References

Roman Catholic